Sahadeva (not to be confused with Sahadeva, the youngest of the Pandavas) was a ruler of the Brihadratha dynasty of Magadha. In the Mahabharata, he is mentioned as the son of Jarasandha, who was placed on the throne of Magadha by the Pandavas on the former's death in a duel with the Pandava prince Bhima. He fought the Kurukshetra War on the side of the Pandavas.

According to the Puranas, he was killed in the Kurukshetra war by Karna along with his cousin, Jayadeva. He was succeeded by Somadhi.

Notes

 Magadha
 Characters in the Mahabharata